TajAir is an air charter company owned by the Tata Group which, through J. R. D. Tata (the first licensed pilot of India), pioneered aviation in India over 80 years ago. It is registered with the Directorate General of Civil Aviation as a non-scheduled operator. It was founded as Megapode Airlines Ltd. on 11 November 1993 and started operations as TajAir on 9 August 2002.

TajAir owns and operates a hangar and an exclusive passenger lounge at the General Aviation (GA) Terminal of Chhatrapati Shivaji Maharaj International Airport, Mumbai.

Fleet
The TajAir fleet as of March 2016 includes:

 3 Dassault Falcon 2000

References

External links
 Official Website of TajAir

Airlines of India
Companies based in Mumbai
Tata Sons subsidiaries
Indian Hotels Company Limited
Indian companies established in 1993
1993 establishments in Maharashtra